Rehabilitation Assistants (RAs), also referred to as occupational therapist assistants (OTAs) and physiotherapist assistants (PTAs) are members of the health care team who work under the supervision of an occupational therapist or a physiotherapist to improve a client's or patient's quality of life.

Scope of Practice
In British Columbia, Canada rehabilitation assistants are not allowed to assess clients but can modify treatment plans set by the physiotherapist and/or occupational therapist.

Education
Preferred education in Canada is the completion of a 2-year full-time diploma from an accredited rehabilitation assistant program.

Responsibilities
Implementing the rehabilitation program as directed by physiotherapist or occupational therapist
Teaching group and individual exercise programs
Wheelchair mobility training
Instructing patients in self care and instrumental activities of daily living 
Assisting in making, modifying, and adapting self-help devices and equipment. 
Application of hot or cold modalities as instructed

Areas of Practice
Hospitals
Rehabilitation Centres
Mental health 
Extended care 
Private practice
Community health
School District

See also
 Occupational therapist
 Physiotherapist

References
 http://www.bcphysio.org/app/member/pdfs/Position_Paper_Final_version.pdf
 http://www.caot.ca/pdfs/CAOT-Poster.JPG
 http://www.caot.ca/pdfs/SupportPer_Profile.pdf

Rehabilitation medicine